Craig Arnold Tracy (born September 9, 1945) is an American mathematician, known for his contributions to mathematical physics and probability theory.

Born in United Kingdom, he moved as infant to Missouri where he grew up and
obtained a B.Sc. in physics from University of Missouri (1967).
He studied as a Woodrow Wilson Fellow 
at the Stony Brook University where he obtained a Ph.D. on the thesis entitled Spin-Spin Scale-Functions in the Ising and XY-Models (1973)
advised by Barry M. McCoy,
in which (also jointly with Tai Tsun Wu and Eytan Barouch) he studied Painlevé functions in exactly 
solvable statistical mechanical models.

He then was on the faculty of Dartmouth College (1978–84) before
joining University of California, Davis (1984) where he is now
a professor. With Harold Widom he worked on the asymptotic analysis of Toeplitz determinants and their various operator theoretic generalizations.  This work gave them both the George Pólya and the Norbert Wiener prizes, and the Tracy–Widom distribution is named after them.

Awards
Woodrow Wilson Fellowship, 1967–68.
Japan Society for the Promotion of Science Fellowship 1991
2002 Pólya Prize (SIAM) shared with Harold Widom
Fellow American Academy of Arts and Sciences 2006
Norbert Wiener Prize 2007, shared with Harold Widom.
Fellow of the American Mathematical Society, 2012

References

20th-century American mathematicians
21st-century American mathematicians
1945 births
University of Missouri alumni
Mathematicians from Missouri
Stony Brook University alumni
Dartmouth College faculty
University of California, Davis faculty
Fellows of the American Academy of Arts and Sciences
Fellows of the American Mathematical Society
Living people
Fellows of the Society for Industrial and Applied Mathematics